is a Japanese musical trio, consisting of vocalist/keyboardist Ikuko Harada, bassist Mito and drummer  Daisuke Itou. Their music is characterized by their quirky sound combining jazzy chord progressions with J-pop and electronica influences. They left their major label and went indie in 2015. 

The name Clammbon is taken from a fictional character in the Kenji Miyazawa novel Yamanashi.

Discography

Original albums

EPs

Other albums

Singles

References

External links
  
 
 Dramatickers, unofficial English fansite

Japanese rock music groups
Musical groups from Tokyo